A portable or mobile toilet (colloquial terms: thunderbox, portaloo, porta-john or porta-potty) is any type of toilet that can be moved around, some by one person, some by mechanical equipment such as a truck and crane. Most types do not require any pre-existing services or infrastructure, such as sewerage, but are completely self-contained. The portable toilet is used  in a variety of situations, for example in urban slums of developing countries, at festivals, for camping, on boats, on construction sites, and at film locations and large outdoor gatherings where there are no other facilities. Most portable toilets are unisex single units with privacy ensured by a simple lock on the door. Some portable toilets are small molded plastic or fiberglass portable rooms with a lockable door and a receptacle to catch the human excreta in a container. 

A portable toilet is not connected to a hole in the ground (like a pit latrine), nor to a septic tank, nor is it plumbed into a municipal system leading to a sewage treatment plant. The chemical toilet is probably the most well-known type of portable toilet, but other types also exist, such as urine-diversion dehydration toilets, composting toilets, container-based toilets, bucket toilets, freezing toilets and incineration toilets. A bucket toilet is a very simple type of portable toilet.

Types

Chemical toilets

A chemical toilet collects human excreta in a holding tank and uses chemicals to minimize the odors. These chemicals may either mask the odor or contain biocides that hinder odor-causing bacteria from multiplying, keeping the smell to a minimum. Chemical toilets include those on plane and trains (although many of these are now vacuum toilets), as well as much simpler ones.

Portable camping toilets 

A simpler type of portable toilet may be used in travel trailers (caravans, camper vans) and on small boats. They are also referred to as "cassette toilet" or "camping toilet", or under brand names that have become generic trademarks. The Oxford English Dictionary lists "Porta Potti" ("with arbitrary respelling") as "A proprietary name for: a portable chemical toilet, as used by campers", and gives mostly American examples from 1968. The OED gives this proprietary name a second meaning, "a small prefabricated unit containing a toilet, designed for easy transportation and temporary installation esp. outdoors", which Wikipedia covers under chemical toilet.

The other name common in British English is "Elsan", which dates back to 1925. According to the Camping and Caravanning Club, "Today you will often see campsites refer to their Chemical Disposal Points as Elsan Disposal Points because of the history and popularity of the brand." The Canal and River Trust uses both brand names, in lieu of any unbranded term.

One colloquialism for these simple toilets is the "bucket and chuck it" system, although in fact they no longer resemble an open bucket (see bucket toilet). These are designed to be emptied into sanitary stations connected to the regular sewage system. These toilets are not to be confused with the types that are plumbed in to the vehicle and need to be pumped out at holding tank dump stations.

Urine-diversion dehydration toilets

Portable urine-diversion dehydration toilets are self-contained dry toilets sometimes referred to as "mobile" or "stand-alone" units. They are identifiable by their one-piece molded plastic shells or, in the case of DIY versions, simple plywood box construction. Most users of self-contained UDDTs rely upon a post-treatment process to ensure pathogen reduction. This post-treatment may consist of long-term storage or addition to an existing or purpose-built compost pile or some combination thereof. A post-treatment step is unnecessary in the case of very modest seasonal use.

Others
A commode chair (a chair enclosing a chamber pot) is a basic portable toilet that was used, for example, in 19th-century Europe.

History

The close stool, built as an article of furniture, is one of the earliest forms of portable toilet. They can still be seen in historic house museums such as Sir George-Étienne Cartier National Historic Site in Old Montreal, Canada. The velvet upholstered close stool used by William III is on display at Hampton Court Palace; see Groom of the Stool.

Early versions of the "Elsan chemical closet" ("closet" meaning a small room, see water closet, WC, and earth closet) were sold at Army & Navy Stores. Their use in World War II bomber aircraft is described at some length by the Bomber Command Museum of Canada; in brief, they were not popular with either the flying crew or the ground crew.

African-Americans living under Jim Crow laws (i.e. before the Civil Rights Act of 1964) faced dangerous challenges. Public toilets were segregated by race, and many restaurants and gas stations refused to serve black people, so some travellers carried a portable toilet in the trunk of their car.

Since 1974, Grand Canyon guides have used ammo boxes to defecate, according to the Museum of Northern Arizona in Flagstaff, Arizona.

Society and culture

A slang term, now dated or historic, is a "thunder-box" (Oxford English Dictionary: "a portable commode; by extension, any lavatory"). The term was used particularly in British India; travel writer Stephen McClarence called it "a crude sort of colonial lavatory". One features to comic effect in Evelyn Waugh's novel Men at Arms:

See also
 Dignified Mobile Toilets, a mobile public toilet system from Nigeria
 Sanitation
 Telescopic toilet

References

External links 
 

Portable buildings and shelters
Street furniture
Toilet types